Dunns is an unincorporated community in Mercer County, West Virginia, United States.

The community derives its name from one Mr. Dunn.

Notable person

Thomas Jefferson Lilly, a member of the United States House of Representatives

References

Unincorporated communities in Mercer County, West Virginia
Unincorporated communities in West Virginia